The Former Historical Archive is a cultural heritage monument in Vučitrn municipality, Kosovo.

History
The former home of the municipality of Vučitrn's Historical Archive is two-story and was built of brick on a stone foundation. The ground floor includes a renovated western façade with a shop window, but the first floor is preserved in its original form inside and out. The western and northern front façades have wood-framed lighting racks with metal railings and a jagged ceiling. The north side front door today has its original half-arch molding. The Communal Historical Archives were founded on 3 March 1968, initially run by the Legal and General Affairs Administrative Directorate of the Municipal Assembly of Vučitrn.

See also 
 Vushtrri
 List of monuments in Vushtrri

References

Historic sites in Kosovo
Cultural heritage monuments in Vushtrri